Jose Mangual, Sr. (March 18, 1924 - September 4, 1998) was a Puerto Rican percussionist world renowned for his bongo drum performances and recordings during the 1940’s and 1950’s with groups such as Machito Orchestra, Charlie Parker, Buddy Rich, Flip Philips, Abbie Lane and Nancy Ames. "He set a standard in bongo playing and was considered by many to have the greatest sound on the instrument."  He is the father of Jose Mangual, Jr. and Luis Mangaul who are both well-known Salsa singers and percussionists. Both were born and raised in East Harlem.

Early career

Mangual began playing percussion at the age of 10 and in 1938 he moved to New York at the age of 14. In 1952 he began playing timbales and percussion for Machito's Orchestra.

Later career

In the 1950's Mangual played with the godfather of modern-day salsa Arsenio Rodriguez and with Latin jazz pioneer Cal Tjader. Thereafter Mangual joined Erroll Gardner's band with whom he traveled the world, playing jazz for international audiences. During this time he also performed and recorded with Cannonball Adderley, Sarah Vaughn and Herbie Mann. During the mid 1950s and 60s, Mangual appeared on numerous albums including Count Basie's 'April in Paris' (1955), Miles Davis' 'Sketches of Spain' (1959), Dizzy Gillespie's 'Talkin' Verve' (1957), Tito Puente's 'Babarabatiri' (1951), Willie Bobo's 'Spanish Grease' (1965), Gato Barbieri's 'Viva Emiliano Zapata' (1974), as well as on multiple Charlie Parker's compilations.

He has also performed with Dexter Gordon, Carmen McRae, Jorge Dalto, Stan Getz, Louis Jordan, Ray Charles, Tito Rodriguez, Xavier Cugat, Tito Puente and Chano Pozo.

In the 1970s, Mangual recorded two instructional albums Buyú and José Mangual* & Carlos "Patato" Valdez* – Understanding Latin Rhythms Vol. 1 with Carlos "Patato" Valdez for the drum maker Latin Percussion (LP).

In 1986 he co-wrote and recorded Los Mangual – Una Dinastia with his sons Jose, Jr. and Luis Mangual. In 2001 he was posthumously inducted into the International Latin Music Hall of Fame.

Discography
 Buyú (Turnstyle, 1977)
 José Mangual* & Carlos "Patato" Valdez* – Understanding Latin Rhythms Vol. 1 (LP Records, 1977)
 Los Mangual – Una Dinastia (Caiman Records, 1986)

Filmography
 The Thrill of Music (1946)

See also
 Afro-Cuban jazz
 Salsa

References

External links

Discography at Discogs

1924 births
1988 deaths
20th-century Puerto Rican male musicians
Afro-Cuban jazz percussionists
Salsa musicians
Salsa music
Bongo players
People from Juana Díaz, Puerto Rico
Puerto Rican percussionists
Jazz fusion musicians
Avant-garde jazz musicians
Puerto Rican male composers
Puerto Rican people of African descent
American salsa musicians